CrazyTalk is Reallusion's brand name for its 2D animation software. The product series includes CrazyTalk, a 2D facial animation software tool, and CrazyTalk Animator, a face and body 2D animation suite.

CrazyTalk, the 2D facial animation software, is a real-time, 2D animation and rendering software that enables users to make 2D animated cartoons. It is a facial animation tool that uses voice and text to vividly animate facial images. It has an auto motion engine which allows animators to use the intensity of their voice to drive their animations in real-time. As of January 2016, the CrazyTalk software is in version 8.

CrazyTalk is developed and marketed by Reallusion, a company that has a software and digital content development base in California and Taiwan, with offices and training centres in the U.S., Germany and Japan.

Although it is still available to purchase CrazyTalk 8 is a legacy product so there will be no further updates or releases (Note that a statement to this effect appears in the Google search results for the official website, but confusingly does not appear to be on the official website).

History
When Reallusion began as a company back in 1993, it first started developing full motion capture systems for real-time applications. During the first stages of development the company originally ran into issues on how tocompany Kodak, at a New York show. Kodak immediately took a liking into the software and chose to work with it in several marketing campaigns. From then on CrazyTalk was born.

Applications
Besides being used as a facial 2D cartoon and avatar creation tool, CrazyTalk is also a platform for app game development. Other applications include using CrazyTalk as a 2D training and marketing resource for education, industry, and business. CrazyTalk also enables users to export projects to iOS devices and directly publish them to social web sites like Facebook, Twitter, or use embedded codes to fit interactive talking avatars into HTML web designs.

Network studios have used CrazyTalk and CrazyTalk Animator in their daily production due to short delivery deadlines. Television shows like Jimmy Kimmel LIVE! use both CrazyTalk and CrazyTalk Animator 2D applications to produce real-time animations for broadcast.

Features
 Character Creation - Face Photo Fitting, Head & Hair Mesh, 3D Face Profile, Custom Eyes & Teeth, Mask & Background.
 Auto Motion - Auto Lip-sync from Text or Audio, Audio-driven Movement, Instant Animation & Mood Scenarios.
 Smart Animation - Face Puppeteering, Avatar Personality, Muscle-based Control, Motion Clip & Layering, Timeline Editing.
 Render & Output - Upload Avatars to iDevices, Popular Image & Video Format Output, Superimpose Avatars for Video Editing.

Content
By default CrazyTalk comes with a collection of usable, template-based content and projects that allow animators to begin animating upon installation. Content includes characters, props, animations, auto motion templates, audio scripts, special effects and demo projects which can be further customized for specific needs.

Additionally, users can choose to purchase new content from the Reallusion Content Store, which hosts a large collection of official Reallusion content for iClone, CrazyTalk, CrazyTalk Animator, FaceFilter and 3DXChange. The Content Store also hosts content packs from 3rd party developers such as Daz 3D, 3D Total Materials, 3D Universe, Dexsoft, Quantum Theory Ent. and others.

Another source for CrazyTalk content is the Reallusion Marketplace which provides a worldwide platform for independent content developers to promote, trade and sell content with CrazyTalk users from around the world. The currency in the Marketplace is known as DA (Direct Access) points which can be used to purchase content packs or redeemed for real cash. Currently, 100 DA Points are equivalent to USD 1.

References

External links

Animation software
2D animation software
Windows graphics-related software
MacOS graphics software